Those Who Dance is a 1930 American Pre-Code crime film produced and distributed by Warner Bros., directed by William Beaudine, and starring Monte Blue, Lila Lee, William "Stage" Boyd and Betty Compson. It is a remake of the 1924 silent film Those Who Dance starring Bessie Love and Blanche Sweet. The story, written by George Kibbe Turner, was based on events that occurred among gangsters in Chicago.

Plot 
A police detective (Monte Blue) is after a famous gangster (William Boyd). The detective disguises himself and lives incognito in the house of the gangster by pretending he is an out-of-town gangster who has just murdered someone. The detective pretends he is the sweetheart of a girl (Lila Lee) who suspects her brother has been framed for murder by Monte Blue. Blue's moll (Betty Compson) is also in on the conspiracy as she became fed up with his cheating, lying and treatment. The life of Lee's brother, who has been sentenced to death in the electric chair, depends on them getting evidence against Boyd.

Cast

Foreign-language versions 
Foreign-language versions were made in Spanish (Los Que Danzan), German The Dance Goes On (Der Tanz geht weiter) and French Counter Investigation (Contre-Enquête). They are all apparently lost.

Pre-Code material 
The film contains a lot of Pre-Code material. For example, Lila Lee's character is called "a professional virgin" and two unmarried couples live together. There is a reference to homosexuality where a man is vaguely called being "that way" about Tim Brady (played by William Janney), etc.

Preservation 
The complete film survives in 16 mm. It was remastered in this format by Associated Artists Productions in 1956 and included in a package of vintage feature films syndicated to television stations. A 16 mm print is housed at the Wisconsin Center for Film & Theater Research. Another print exists at the Library of Congress.

References

External links 
 
 

1930 films
1930 crime drama films
1930 multilingual films
American black-and-white films
American crime drama films
American gangster films
American multilingual films
1930s English-language films
Films directed by William Beaudine
Films produced by Robert North
Sound film remakes of silent films
1930s American films